Antonio Maurice Lang (born May 15, 1972) is an American former professional basketball player who currently serves as an assistant coach for the Cleveland Cavaliers of the National Basketball Association (NBA). He played college basketball at Duke, where he won back-to-back NCAA tournaments in 1991 and 1992.

High School and College career
Born in Columbia, South Carolina and raised in Mobile, Alabama, Lang graduated as valedictorian from LeFlore Magnet High School in 1990. The year before, he helped the school win a state championship in basketball. Lang had a productive collegiate basketball career, as he was a member of a Duke team that won two championships in three Final Four appearances.

Professional career
Lang was selected by the Phoenix Suns in the second round (29th overall) in the 1994 NBA Draft; however, he saw limited action during his rookie year due to a knee injury. He was traded to the Cleveland Cavaliers in 1995 along with Dan Majerle. Lang also had stints with the Toronto Raptors, Philadelphia 76ers, and Miami Heat. In addition, Lang played in the Continental Basketball Association (with the Fort Wayne Fury and Grand Rapids Hoops), where he was selected to the All-CBA Second Team in 1998. He played in the Philippine Basketball Association, with the Red Bull Thunder.

Lang began playing in 2001 for the Mitsubishi Melco Dolphins (now the Mitsubishi Diamond Dolphins) of the Japan Basketball League. Foot problems, though, prompted Lang to retire from playing basketball in 2006.

Coaching career
Lang became an assistant coach for the Dolphins following his retirement. On May 19, 2010, Lang was named as the Dolphins' head coach.

Lang was hired as an assistant coach for the Utah Jazz in June 2014. He joined the staff of Quin Snyder, who is also a former Duke basketball player. On June 19, 2019, Lang was hired as assistant coach for the Cleveland Cavaliers.

Head coaching record in Japan

|-
| style="text-align:left;"|Mitsubishi Electric
| style="text-align:left;"|2010-11
| 36||11||25|||| style="text-align:center;"|7th|||-||-||-||
| style="text-align:center;"|-
|-
| style="text-align:left;"|Mitsubishi Electric
| style="text-align:left;"|2011-12
| 42||12||30|||| style="text-align:center;"|7th|||-||-||-||
| style="text-align:center;"|-
|-
| style="text-align:left;"|Mitsubishi Electric
| style="text-align:left;"|2012-13
| 42||12||30|||| style="text-align:center;"|7th|||-||-||-||
| style="text-align:center;"|-
|-
| style="text-align:left;"|Mitsubishi Electric
| style="text-align:left;"|2013-14
| 54||29||25|||| style="text-align:center;"|3rd in Western|||2||0||2||
| style="text-align:center;"|6th
|-

References

External links

Official website

1972 births
Living people
African-American basketball players
American expatriate basketball people in Brazil
American expatriate basketball people in Canada
American expatriate basketball people in Japan
American expatriate basketball people in the Philippines
American men's basketball players
Barako Bull Energy Boosters players
Basketball coaches from Alabama
Basketball coaches from South Carolina
Basketball players from Alabama
Basketball players from Columbia, South Carolina
Cleveland Cavaliers assistant coaches
Cleveland Cavaliers players
Duke Blue Devils men's basketball players
Fort Wayne Fury players
Grand Rapids Hoops players
Miami Heat players
Nagoya Diamond Dolphins coaches
Nagoya Diamond Dolphins players
Parade High School All-Americans (boys' basketball)
Philadelphia 76ers players
Philippine Basketball Association imports
Phoenix Suns draft picks
Phoenix Suns players
Small forwards
Sportspeople from Columbia, South Carolina
Sportspeople from Mobile, Alabama
Toronto Raptors players
UniCEUB/BRB players
Universiade gold medalists for the United States
Universiade medalists in basketball
Utah Jazz assistant coaches
Medalists at the 1993 Summer Universiade
21st-century African-American sportspeople
20th-century African-American sportspeople